The 2020 Miami Hurricanes women's soccer team represented University of Miami during the 2020 NCAA Division I women's soccer season.  The Hurricanes were led by head coach Sarah Barnes, in her third season.  They played home games at Cobb Stadium.  This is the team's 22nd season playing organized women's college soccer and their 17th playing in the Atlantic Coast Conference.

Due to the COVID-19 pandemic, the ACC played a reduced schedule in 2020 and the NCAA Tournament was postponed to 2021.  The ACC did not play a spring league schedule, but did allow teams to play non-conference games that would count toward their 2020 record in the lead up to the NCAA Tournament.

The Hurricanes finished the fall season 0–8–0, 0–8–0 in ACC play to finish in a thirteenth place. They did not qualify for the ACC Tournament.  They finished the spring season 1–2–1 and were not invited to the NCAA Tournament.

Previous season 

The Hurricanes finished the season 5–9–2 overall, and 2–7–1 in ACC play to finish in eleventh place.  They did not qualify for the ACC Tournament and were not invited to the NCAA Tournament.

Squad

Roster

Updated March 12, 2021

Team management

Source:

Schedule

Source:

|-
!colspan=6 style=""| Fall Regular season

|-
!colspan=6 style=""| Spring Regular season

Rankings

Fall 2020

Spring 2021

References

Miami (FL)
Miami Hurricanes women's soccer seasons
2020 in sports in Florida